Zou Yuchen (born July 5, 1996) is a Chinese male professional basketball player who currently plays for Bayi Rockets in the Chinese Basketball Association.

Career
Zou Yuchen was born in Anshan, Liaoning to a basketball family. His parents were players from the Bayi Basketball Team, now known as the Bayi Rockets. While he was a child, Zou was bulkier than many of his peers and had the build of a basketball player. His family immigrated from Anshan to Zhuhai during his childhood, but there was not a professional basketball team in those days. Dai Yixin, the president of Shenzhen Sports School who once recruited Yi Jianlian to the school, introduced Zou to Shenzhen Sports School, but Zou's parents refused the offer. Dai had no choice but to request the famous basketball coach Ma Yuenan to persuade Zou's parents. Finally, Zou's parents agreed that Zou would go to the sports school. Zou formally started his basketball career in September 2008.

Zou started as a member of the Juvenile Group in Liaoning's basketball team. In 2009, he became a member of Bayi Youth Basketball Team. In March 2016, he was chosen to play in China men's national basketball team at the 2016 Summer Olympics in Rio de Janeiro, Brazil.

References

External links 
 
 
 
 

1996 births
Living people
Chinese men's basketball players
Centers (basketball)
Olympic basketball players of China
Basketball players at the 2016 Summer Olympics
Bayi Rockets players
Sportspeople from Anshan
Sportspeople from Shenzhen
Basketball players from Liaoning